Leptodeira septentrionalis, the northern cat-eyed snake, is a species of medium-sized, slightly venomous snake, found from southern Texas to Costa Rica.

Appearance

The northern cat eye is medium size (up to ). In general females are slightly longer than males. They have smooth scales, with dark brown line or spot beside the eye and dark brown blotches (which can fuse to form a zigzag) running down their backs, these spots may vary in pattern geographically. Its head is distinctly wider than its neck and it has large bulging eyes with reddish irises and light brown elliptical pupils.

Behaviour 
The northern cat eye is primarily arboreal and entirely nocturnal. At night it hunts for frogs and their eggs, it is particularly known for feeding on those of the red-eyed tree frog. It swallows eggs and small frogs alive but kills larger frogs with mild venom from its enlarged, grooved rear fangs. When threatened it is able to flatten its head and spread its jaws although it rarely bites people.

Reproduction and development 

The Northern cat eye is oviparous and produces clutches of 6–13 eggs. As in other snake species delayed egg fertilisation can occur (fertile eggs can be laid up to several years after copulation). Developing snakes are nourished by a yolk sac for 79 to 90 days at which time they break through the outer shell using an  egg tooth. The egg tooth is lost after hatching. Young northern cat-eyed snakes appear identical to adults but feature much fresher coloration. The snakes will continue to grow throughout their entire lives.

Distribution 
The northern cat eye is found in North America: US (S Texas), Mexico (Chiapas, Nuevo León, Quéretaro, Oaxaca, Puebla, Coahuila, Jalisco, Campeche, Yucatán, Quintana Roo, Nayarit), Guatemala, Honduras, Belize, El Salvador, Nicaragua, and Costa Rica.

References 

Snakes of North America
Snakes of Central America
Leptodeira
Reptiles described in 1859
Taxa named by Robert Kennicott